Fournoi Korseon, more commonly simply Fournoi, anciently known as Corsiae or Korsiai, Corseae or Korseai (Κορσεαί), Corsia or Korsia (Κορσία), and Corassiae (Κορασσίαι), form a complex or archipelago of small Greek islands that lie between Ikaria, Samos and Patmos in Ikaria regional unit, North Aegean region. The two largest islands of the complex, the main isle of Fournoi  and the isle of Thymaina , are inhabited, as is Agios Minas Island  to the east. The municipality has an area of 45.247 km2. On the main isle Fournoi (town) is the largest settlement and then Chrysomilia in the north the second largest (and third largest overall, after Thymaina). Fournoi (town) proper is the main ferry harbour, with ferries also landing on Thymaina.

Many of the inhabitants are fishermen, although during the summer season the population is also occupied in tourist activities, mostly room rentals and catering. On the main island are a number of beaches such as Vlychada, Vitsilia, Petrokopio, Elidaki, and Bali.

The archipelago is famous for being a hub of the Ancient World, which resulted in 53 shipwrecks found in the area until 2017. Another five shipwrecks were found in 2018, raising the total number to 58. Those wrecks date back from 4th century BC to 19th century AD.

Climate
The climate is arid and hot during summers. Winters are rather mild with average rainfall but constant strong archipelagic winds prevail.

Transportation 
Transportation is often interrupted during the winter period (mostly from November to April) due to bad weather, mainly strong winds. The rest of the year regular links with the islands of Ikaria and Samos (by boat only) is available. Since 2008 a ferry coming from Samos reaches Athens stopping also in Icaria and Paros.

Archaeology
Archaeologist discovered a ship graveyard off the coast of the Fourni Islands, with 53 ships. It contains wrecks dating from the 4th century BC through the 19th century AD. In 2018, archaeologists discovered five additional vessels, bringing the total number of ships found there to 58. The newly discovered ships rest in shallow waters and show signs of damage from fishing nets and plunderers, the archaeological team also found cargoes of amphoras that carried wine, oil, and other foods, and a load of terracotta lamps dating to the 2nd century AD. The lamps were made in Corinthian workshops, and bear the names of the artisans who crafted them, Octavius and Lucius.

Settlements and islands
The main island of Fournoi has a population of 1,320, or over 90 percent of the municipality's population. The only other inhabited islands are Agios Minas, and Thymaina.

References

External links
Official website 
Fournoi island at gtp.gr
http://www.fourni.com/

 
Populated places in Ikaria (regional unit)
Municipalities of the North Aegean
Archipelagoes of Greece
Landforms of Ikaria (regional unit)
Islands of the North Aegean